Playasia is an online retailer of entertainment products from Asia. The website sells import games, DVDs, music, CDs, gadgets, groceries, books, gaming console accessories, cables and toys. Playasia is based in Hong Kong and caters to the Asia-Pacific region, but also offers most of the products to international buyers.

History

Launch
Playasia was established in 2002 in Hong Kong, with the launch of its website selling games and accessories for all major current game consoles and computer operating systems. In addition to video games, the site also offers electronic goods, such as products from the Tamagotchi series.

Funding of game development
Playasia had funded the development of side-scrolling shooter Söldner-X: Himmelsstürmer.

Import suspension 
After the lawsuit against Lik-Sang for importing NTSC-J PlayStation 3 hardware and software to Europe, Play-Asia announced that it would no longer be shipping PlayStation products to the EU.
 

However, there have been big changes in the video games industry, such as console manufacturers and publishers abandoning regional lockouts and the evolution of consumer buying behaviour driven by the acceptance and growth of global cross-border ecommerce, encouraged by major branded ecommerce platforms like Amazon, Ebay and Alibaba. Therefore, Playasia still ships PlayStation products and games Globally as of late 2010, as well as into Europe.

Play Exclusives - Premium Physical Releases 
In January 2017 Playasia launched Soldner X-2: Final Prototype to begin the PLAY Exclusives program, a line of still ongoing physical console releases manufactured in partnership with publishing company Eastasiasoft. The goal of the publishing venture is to support and promote indie developers and their games, as well as physical game collecting. 

Originally launching with only PlayStation 4 and PlayStation Vita releases, Playasia eventually expanded into Nintendo Switch releases in 2018 with titles such as Dimension Drive, RXN -Raijin-, and Death Road to Canada.

Due to the niche nature of game collecting PLAY Exclusive releases are produced as a single batch ranging from 1,000 - 6,000 copies per console release and are determined by demand. As a result many of the popular releases and titles sell out shortly after opening sale.

References

External links
 Official website

Entertainment companies of Hong Kong
Online retailers of Hong Hong
Internet properties established in 2002
2002 establishments in Hong Kong